This is an inclusive list of science fiction television programs whose names begin with the letter J.

J
Live-action
Jack of All Trades (2000)
Jake 2.0 (2003–2004)
Jason of Star Command (1978–1979, Tarzan and the Super 7 segment)
Jekyll (2007, UK)
Jensen Project, The (2010, film)
Jeopardy (2002–2004, Scotland/Australia)
Jeremiah (2002–2004)
Jericho (2006–2008)
Joe 90 (1968–1969, UK, puppetry)
John Doe (2002)
Johnny Jupiter (1953)
Journey of Allen Strange, The (1997–2000)
Journey to the Center of the Earth (franchise):
Journey to the Center of the Earth (1989, film)
Journey to the Center of the Earth (1993, film) IMDb
Journey to the Center of the Earth (1999, miniseries) IMDb
Journey to the Center of the Earth (2008, film)
Journeyman (2007)
Jupiter Moon (1990, UK)
Justice League of America (1997, pilot, film)

Animated
J9 (franchise):
Braiger (1981–1982, Japan, animated)
Baxingar (1982–1983, Japan, animated)
Sasuraiger (1983–1984, Japan, animated)
Jayce and the Wheeled Warriors (1985, France/Canada/Japan, animated)
Jetsons, The (1962–1963, 1985–1987, animated)
Jetter Mars (1977, Japan, animated)
Jimmy Two-Shoes (2009–2011, Canada/UK/US, animated)
Jing: King of Bandits (2002, Japan, animated)
Johnny Test (2005–2014, animated)
Jonny Quest (franchise):
Real Adventures of Jonny Quest, The (1996–1999, animated)
Jonny Quest vs. The Cyber Insects (1995, animated, film, New Adventures of Jonny Quest, The sequel)
Jonny's Golden Quest (1993, animated, film, New Adventures of Jonny Quest, The sequel)
New Adventures of Jonny Quest, The (1986–1987, animated, Jonny Quest sequel)
Jonny Quest (1964–1965, animated)
Josie and the Pussycats in Outer Space (1972, animated)
Journey to the Center of the Earth (franchise):
Journey to the Center of the Earth (1967, animated)
A Journey to the Center of the Earth (1977, Australia, animated) IMDb
Journey to the Center of the Earth (1996, Canada, animated) IMDb
Journey to the Center of the Earth (2001, France, animated) IMDb
Jushin Liger (1989–1990, Japan, animated)
Justice League (franchise):
Justice League (2001–2004, animated)
Justice League Unlimited (2004–2006, animated)
Young Justice (2010–2013, animated)
Justice League Action (2016–2018, animated)
Jyu-Oh-Sei (2006, Japan, animated)

References

Television programs, J